"That's How I'm Livin'" is a song performed by American recording artist Ice-T. It was released as the second single from the rapper's fifth studio album Home Invasion. The song was produced by Tracy "Ice-T" Marrow, Shafiq "SLJ" Husayn and Alphonso "DJ Aladdin" Henderson, and released via  Records on September 21, 1993 in the United States, and on December 16, 1993 in the United Kingdom. The single peaked at number 21 in the UK, and later was included in the rapper's greatest hits album Greatest Hits: The Evidence.

A music video was released for the clean version of the single.  This showed a group of children watching from behind a screen as Ice-T is brought in by police.  A brief clip of the book Pimp: the story of my life by Iceberg Slim is shown when the line "I was intrigued by the pimp game" is uttered.

Track listing

Personnel
 Tracy Lauren Marrow – vocals, lyrics, producer, arranger, re-mixing
 Alphonso Henderson – producer, arranger
 Shafiq "SLJ" Husayn – producer
 Ronin Inc. – (re-)producer
 David Morales – additional producer, re-mixing
 Tony Pizarro – engineering
 Chris Johnson – engineering
 Richard "DJ Ace" Ascencio – re-mixing
 Henry Garcia – re-mixing
 Tom Baker – mastering
 Miles Showell – mastering
 Jorge Hinojosa – management

Chart positions

References

External links

1993 songs
Ice-T songs
Gangsta rap songs
Songs written by Ice-T